Michael Arthur Krauss (born March 5, 1939 in Detroit, Michigan) is the former  husband of TV host Joan Lunden. He was a television segment producer, a packager, and a radio interviewer. He was also an experienced company president having headed numerous companies including Michael Krauss Productions and Group M Productions, the producer of "Mother's Minutes".  He is a winner of the ACE Award in 1985 for his work as a creator and executive producer of Mother's Day.  As a television segment producer he helped to produce several shows including Good Morning America, The Mike Douglas Show, Mother's Day (Lifetime Television), Mother's Minutes, and Everyday With Joan Lunden.  He is also a very experienced jazz drummer.

Career 
Michael's first show was created as part of his graduation project for Wayne State University and was called Youth Must Know and eventually aired locally on PBS.  Krauss went on to co-create and produce the Morning Show in Detroit.  After the Morning Show he produced The Other Side of the Stars before segment producing The Mike Douglas Show, where he claims he convinced John Lennon and Yoko Ono to cohost for 5 shows.  Booking John and Yoko was a momentous occasion and took the 14th spot on VH1's list of "100 Greatest Rock & Roll Moments on TV".  He is now working on a coffee table book about the shows with John Lennon.

After the Mike Douglas Show, Krauss went on to segment produce for ABC, where he met and married Joan Lunden of Good Morning America and where he was nominated for two Emmys, including one for "Producer, Best Daytime Show".  After Good Morning America, he created and produced Mother's Day with Joan Lunden,  winning an ACE Award for Best Show in 1984. Mother's Day was also awarded the Parent's Choice Award. Day ran for 8 years on the Lifetime channel. After Mother's Day he created and executive produced the spin-off Mother's Minutes. "Minutes",  hosted by Joan Lunden, were quick segments about taking care of children. Joan and Michael released a home video called Your Newborn Baby: Everything You Need to Know.  TV Guide called this video "one of the best instructional home-video programs ever produced". The critical and commercial success of the home video led to a book version as well.

Krauss went on to produce many other shows but closed his company, Michael Krauss Productions, when "Everyday with Joan Lunden" failed to clear a second season.  In the past few years he started to bring the company back with a radio program for seniors called Great American Secrets, a segment on the Stu Taylor Show. He currently has offices in Cos Cob, Connecticut, where he heads the company, "Make It Happen Broadcasting", working in part with Vanessa Miller.

Krauss is also an experienced author having written two books in conjunction with Mother's Day. He also wrote a nationally syndicated newspaper column called "Parents Talk" that was available in 88 different newspapers. "Parents Talk" was a column that was released in a stripping fashion. Krauss has also worked as a district manager for the Spirit of Halloween, night manager of Shoprite of Stamford, and sales associate at BMW of Greenwich.

Jazz drumming 
Michael Krauss has been drumming for most of his life, having first picked up the drum sticks at age 7. His first major band was the Four Counts, a group with his high school friends from Mumford High in Detroit. After the Four Counts ended, Krauss continued to play the drums and ended up sitting in with such stars as The Buddy Rich Big Band, Harry Connick Jr., Grover Washington Jr., and The Gene Krupa Band. He also played with Stevie Wonder while in Detroit. He led his own 15 piece group, which often performed at a Chinese restaurant in Mamaroneck. New York and the Blue Note in Greenwich Village.

Books 
 Your Newborn Baby: Everything You Need To Know (1988) - 
 Joan Lunden's Mother's Minutes (1986) -

References

External links 

Living people
American television producers
Wayne State University alumni
1939 births